Buwāṭ (بواط) is located near Mount Juhaynah in the neighborhood of Raḍwā. It was situated on the caravan route of the Quraysh merchants to Syria.

The Islamic prophet Muhammad launched a military campaign in this area known as the Patrol of Buwat.

See also
List of expeditions of Muhammad

References

Populated places in Mecca Province
Islam in Saudi Arabia